Vungakoto "Vunga" Lilo (born 28 February 1983, in Ha'apai, Tonga) is a rugby union footballer who plays for Montauban having previously played for a number of clubs including Bordeaux and Bristol. He also plays internationally for Tonga and competed at the 2007 Rugby World Cup and the 2011 Rugby World Cup. He plays as a fullback.

External links
Cornish Pirates Archives Profile

Living people
1983 births
Bristol Bears players
People from Haʻapai
Tonga international rugby union players
Tongan rugby union players
Tongan expatriate rugby union players
Expatriate rugby union players in England
Expatriate rugby union players in France
Tongan expatriate sportspeople in England
Tongan expatriate sportspeople in France
Union Bordeaux Bègles players
Rugby union fullbacks